The Swing Landscape is a modernist mural by the American painter Stuart Davis, painted in 1938 and on permanent display in the Sidney and Lois Eskenazi Museum of Art at Indiana University, Bloomington, IN, USA [Accession #42.1]. It is considered one of the most important American paintings in the 20th-century.

History
The Works Progress Administration commissioned a mural for its Williamsburg Housing Project in Brooklyn, New York, from Davis in 1937. After completing a study of the mural in 1938 (currently held by the National Gallery of Art), Davis spent a year completing the full mural. However, it was never installed for reasons unknown. Davis drew on the sketches he made in the 1930s of docks, piers, and fishing schooners in Gloucester, Massachusetts.

References

External links
 "Stuart Davis and American Abstraction: A Masterpiece in Focus", Philadelphia Museum of Art
 Listing at the Whitney Museum of American Art
 McComas, Jennifer, Swing Landscape: Stuart Davis and the Modernist Mural, 2020
 Sidney and Lois Eskenazi Museum of Art at Indiana University (Bloomington), online collection entry

1930s paintings
Paintings by Stuart Davis
Paintings in the collection of the Whitney Museum of American Art